Gogoi (Assamese: গগৈ) is an Assamese surname, used by many communities of Assam including the Ahoms. The word originates from the Deori language word 'Gogoi' which means Younger brother. This surname was granted by the Ahom King, to those who were very dear to the Ahom royal Family, indicating high officials to the Ahom Kingdom. Swargadeo Rudra Singha divided the clans of the Satgharia Ahom ("Ahom of the seven houses") aristocracy into two main divisions: Gohain and Gogoi. In Ahom Kingdom, two Borphukans with the title of Gogoi from the Dihingia and Patar clan, served Swargadeo Gaurinath Singha and Swargadeo Chandrakanta Singha respectively, as one of the Patra Mantris (Council of five Ministers).  

People with this surname include: 

Akhil Gogoi, Indian social activist.
Dip Gogoi Indian politician
Ganesh Gogoi, Indian poet
Gaurav Gogoi, Indian politician
Kesab Chandra Gogoi, Indian politician
Lila Gogoi, writer, educationist and historian
Mina Gogoi, Indian politician
Pradip Gogoi, Indian politician
Pranab Kumar Gogoi, Indian politician
Probin Kumar Gogoi, Indian politician
Promode Gogoi, Indian politician
Ranjan Gogoi, 46th Chief Justice of India
Simple Gogoi, Indian filmmaker
Anirban Gogoi, Poet And Social Worker Of Assam
Tarun Gogoi, Indian politician
Topon Kumar Gogoi, Indian politician
Manas Gogoi, Indian Scientist on Quantum Physics

Notes

References
 Barbaruah Hiteswar Ahomar-Din or A History of Assam under the Ahoms first edition 1981 Publication Board of Assam Guwahati

Ahom kingdom
Assamese-language surnames